Naft Chal (also Romanized as Naft Chāl) is a village in Lafur Rural District, North Savadkuh County, Mazandaran Province, Iran. At the 2006 census, its population was 340, in 114 families.

References 

Populated places in Savadkuh County